The Gulley Flats Boys is a double-disc album from British musician Francis Dunnery, released in 2005. It is very stripped down, revolving around Dunnery's acoustic guitar playing and piano, courtesy of David Sancious, and featuring minimal percussion. It features two re-recordings of older songs in Good Life and Heartache Reborn - the latter being almost entirely re-worked. Lyrically, the album deals with the reaching of "the middle of life", and Francis has stated that it deals with a mid-life crisis of sorts.   The title of the album is a reference to the council estate in Cumbria, North-west England where Francis grew up alongside the friends pictured on the album cover.

Track listing
Disc One
 "Soldier"
 "Give Up and Let it Go"
 "Autumn the Rain Man"
 "In My Father's Eyes"
 "My Old Friend Love"
 "Bobbie Jo"
 "Joy"
 "The Middle of Life"
Disc Two
 "Living in New York City"
 "Just a Man"
 "Good Life"
 "Chocolate Heart"
 "Heartache Reborn"
 "The Gulley Flats Boys"
 "Someone Like Me"

References

2005 albums
Francis Dunnery albums